Sahaya Sheelan Shadrach (born 24 March 1966) known by his screen name Sadhu Kokila, is an Indian musician, actor, comedian, film director and producer, and an occasional screenwriter and lyricist who works in Kannada cinema. He began his career as a composer before taking to acting in films, appearing mostly in comic roles. He has also directed ten Kannada films, the most notable one being Raktha Kanneeru (2003).

As a composer, he is a two-time recipient of the Karnataka State Film Award for Best Music Director, which he won for Rakshasa (2005) and Inthi Ninna Preethiya (2008). As an actor, he has received multiple nominations and awards in the category of Best Comedian in the South Indian International Movie Awards.

Early life and career
Sadhu Kokila was born as Sahaya Sheelan on 24 March 1966 into a Tamil nadar Christian family of Natesh and Mangala in Bangalore in the Indian State of Mysore (now Karnataka). He was born to a family of musicians with father being a violinist in a music band of Karnataka Police Department, his mother and sister being playback singers. Sadhu Kokila's brother Layendra is also an actor. Kokila studied in St. Joseph's Indian High School, Bangalore. He was given the stage name Sadhu Kokila by Upendra, the director of Sheelan's debut film Shhh!.

Kokila began his career as a musician after he was taken to musician Kasturi Shankar by his brother. He is also one of the fastest keyboard players in India.

Personal life
Kokila married Saleena in 1993. They have two children together, Suraag and Srujan.

Filmography

As actor

As director

As composer

Awards and nominations 
Karnataka State Film Awards
 2004–05: Best Music Director: Rakshasa
 2007–08: Best Music Director: Inthi Ninna Preethiya

South Indian International Movie Awards
 2011: Best Comedian: Hudugaru
 2012: Best Comedian: Yaare Koogadali

IIFA Utsavam
2016: Best Performance In A Comic Role: Mr. and Mrs. Ramachari

South Indian International Movie Awards
 2019: Best Comedian: Yajamana

References

External links
 
 Personal website
 Sadhu Kokila Filmography

Male actors in Kannada cinema
Kannada film score composers
Kannada film directors
Living people
21st-century Indian male actors
Male actors from Bangalore
1966 births
Film directors from Bangalore
Indian male comedians
Kannada comedians
21st-century Indian film directors
Indian male film actors
20th-century Indian male actors
Musicians from Bangalore
20th-century Indian composers
21st-century Indian composers
Film producers from Bangalore
Kannada screenwriters
Screenwriters from Bangalore
Kannada film producers
Recipients of the Rajyotsava Award 2015
Male actors in Telugu cinema